Lisammayude Veedu (English: Lisamma's House) is a 2013 Malayalam drama film written and directed by Babu Janardhanan and starring  Meera Jasmine, Rahul Madhav and Salim Kumar. The film is a sequel to the 2006 film Achanurangatha Veedu. The film was initially titled Samuvelinte Makkal but was later renamed Lisammayude Veedu based on the name of the central character.

Plot summary

Achanurangaatha Veedu (2006) told the story of a father's suffering as his under-aged daughter Lisamma is kidnapped and is forced into a sex racket. In Lisammayude Veedu, the young girl Lisamma has grown up and seems to have adjusted to her past. She runs a telephone booth and looks after her two sisters and her father who has lost his mental balance after seeing his daughter suffer.

She, however, looks on life with a somewhat caustic sense of humour and has become worldly wise. Her brave attitude wins her an admirer in Shivankutty, who is a head load worker and has communist ideals. He also acts as a strongman for his party when required.

The two get married and life is good for Lisamma as she gives birth to a baby boy. When the child is four years old, Shivankutty's past catches up with him and he is killed by his enemies.

The film comments on current situations, is critical of the leftist ideology, and espouses the theory of what goes around comes around.

Cast

 Meera Jasmine as Lisamma Samuel
 Rahul Madhav as Sivankutty/Arjun Sivankutty
 Master navaneeth madhav as Childhood Of Arjun
 Salim Kumar as Samuel/Prabhakaran
 Jagadeesh as Utthaman
 Baiju As Rajappan Uduma
 Gopu Nair
 P. Sreekumar as Cherkalam Hamza
 Sudheer Karamana   as Antappan
 Johny Antony as himself 
 V. K. Sreeraman
 Sangeetha Mohan as Tressa Samuel
 Anu Joseph as Sherly Samuel
 Renjusha Menon
 Murali as Shekharan Nair (Cameo Appearance)
 T. S. Raju as Thomas Mathew (Cameo Appearance)
 Prasanth as Tommy Kunjariya (Cameo Appearance)
 Manikandan Pattambi as Maniyappan (Cameo Appearance)
 Vishnupriya (Cameo Appearance)

References

External links
 

2013 films
Indian drama films
2010s Malayalam-language films
Indian sequel films
Veedu